The seventeenth season of South African Idols premiered on 11 July 2021 and concluded on 21 November 2021 on the Mzansi Magic television network. The season was won by Berry Trytsman and the runner-up was Karabo Mathe.

The season saw judge Somizi Mhlongo being asked to "take time off" from the show to deal with domestic abuse allegations against him. This resulted in him only appearing in the first few pre-recorded episodes and none of the live ones. He was replaced by a guest judge each week for the rest of the season.

After 17 and 11 years as judges respectively, it was announced shortly before the start of the eighteenth season that Randall Abrahams and Unathi Nkayi would not be returning to the show.

Finalists

Weekly Song Choice and Result

Top 16: The Biggest Hits of Today

Group A (29 August)

 Guest Judge: Lady Du

Group B (5 September)

 Guest Judge: Buhle Mda

Top 10 (Top 9): Battle of the DJs (19 September) 

This round saw contesants perform hit songs by five DJs: DJ Cleo, Prince Kaybee, Sun-El Musician, De Mthuda and DJ Sumbody.

Ithana Conjwa withdrew from the competition due to health reasons a day before performing in the non-elimination round broadcast on 12 September. This meant that the top 10 round immediately became the top 9 round.

Top 8 (26 September) 

 Guest Judge: Dineo Ranaka

Top 7

Top 7: Mzansi Greats (3 October) 

 Guest Judge: Zahara

Top 7: Showstopper (11 October) 
On 11 October, it was announced that there would be no elimination that week, and would resume the following week. All seven contestants went on to perform their prepared showstopper songs.

 Guest Judge: Thembi Seete

Top 6: Oskido's Playlist & Max Martin's Songbook (17 October) 

 Guest Judge: Oskido

Top 5: Mzansi Gay Choir (24 October) 

 Guest Judge: Khaya Dladla

Top 4: Judges' Picks & SAMA Winners (31 October) 

 Guest Judge: Kelly Khumalo

Top 3: Gospel Duet (7 November) 

 Guest Judge: Judith Sephuma
 Before his elimination, Kevin Maduna got a chance to perform his gospel duet song "Ukuhlala Kuye" with Dumi Mkokstad.

Top 2 (14 November) 

 Guest Judge: Msaki
 Before her elimination, S'22kile performed her single "Falling".

Elimination Chart 
Colour key

References

Season 17
2021 South African television seasons